Dizzya is an extinct, monotypic genus of bat that occurred in the Chambi region, Tunisia, in the Middle Eocene. It was described based on a single upper molar, a lower dentary with two broken teeth, and a humerus. It is the smallest and, along with Witwatia sigei, the oldest representative of the Philisidae, an extinct family of bats related to the Vespertilionidae.

References

Eocene bats
Prehistoric bat genera
Prehistoric monotypic mammal genera
Eocene mammals of Africa
Fossil taxa described in 1991